Xuba Township (<!—see MOS:ZH-->) is a township in Yi'an District of Tongling, Anhui, China.

Administrative division
As of 2017, the township is divided into one community and sixteen villages: 
 Funing Community 
 Xuguang 
 Xinzhou 
 Wenxing 
 Qunxin 
 Honglou 
 Longtan 
 Yiguan 
 Chongxin 
 Anping 
 Zilong 
 Xijiang 
 Zhongzhou 
 Hongmiao 
 Qianjiang 
 Jiangbin 
 Changyang

History
It was incorporated as a township in 1957. It was renamed as "Xuba Commune" in 1961 and was renamed "Xuba Township" in 1983.

Due to floods, all residents in the township and Laozhou Township of Tongling along the Yangtze River were ordered to evacuate on July 11, 2020.

Economy
The township is rich in rape and vegetables.

Education
There are two middle schools in the township: Anping Ciji Middle School and Xuba Middle School.

References

Township-level divisions of Anhui
Divisions of Yi'an District